Juan Héctor Rojas Lobos (born 11 June 1935) is a Chilean footballer.

Club career
As a youth player, Rojas was with Deportivo Colombia and Audax Italiano, before joining Magallanes youth ranks. After a stint on loan at Deportivo Fanaloza, he made his debut with Magallanes in 1956 against San Luis de Quillota. Next, he played for Deportes La Serena (1958–1963), O'Higgins (1964) and Deportivo Cali (1965).

International career
He played in five matches for the Chile national football team from 1957 to 1959. He was also part of Chile's squad for the 1959 South American Championship that took place in Argentina.

Honours
Deportivo Fanaloza
 Liga Penquista Top Goalscorer: 1955

Deportes La Serena
 Copa Preparación: 1960

O'Higgins
 Segunda División de Chile: 1964

References

External links
 
 Juan Rojas at PartidosdeLaRoja.com 

1935 births
Living people
Footballers from Santiago
Chilean footballers
Chilean expatriate footballers
Chile international footballers
Association football midfielders
Deportes Magallanes footballers
Magallanes footballers
Deportes La Serena footballers
O'Higgins F.C. footballers
Deportivo Cali footballers
Chilean Primera División players
Primera B de Chile players
Categoría Primera A players
Chilean expatriate sportspeople in Colombia
Expatriate footballers in Colombia